The Federal Detention Center (FDC Philadelphia) is a United States Federal prison in Center City, Philadelphia, Pennsylvania which holds male and female inmates prior to or during court proceedings, as well as inmates serving brief sentences. It is operated by the Federal Bureau of Prisons, a division of the United States Department of Justice.

The jail, across from the William J. Green Jr. Federal Building, is on a  site the southwest corner of Arch Street and 7th Street, across from the African American Museum in Philadelphia and in the Independence Mall area.

The jail is 12 stories tall. It has 628 cells for United States Marshal Service pre-trial inmates, primarily from the Eastern District of Pennsylvania, the District of New Jersey and the District of Delaware. Federal Detention Center Philadelphia is also a United States Parole Commission Revocation Site. 120 prisoners, already sentenced, serve as staff. The prison is connected to a tunnel that allows people to travel to and from the James A. Byrne United States Courthouse.

History
The proposal to build the jail at its current site, which at the time was a mostly vacant plot of land, was made public in February 1992. Spokespersons for the museum and the businesses at the East Market Street expressed opposition to the proposal, as did businesses in Chinatown and U.S. House of Representatives member Thomas Foglietta. The East Market Street businesses did not want prisoners close to their businesses. The African-American museum objected to a reminder of the incarceration of black men. Chinatown businesses stated that the prison may drive away customers and block expansion of Chinatown from the Vine Street Expressway. Edmund Bacon wrote in The Philadelphia Inquirer that he believed that this jail would damage efforts to revitalize portions of Center City.

As of April 1993, prior to the opening of the detention center, there were 18 federal prisons throughout the U.S. that housed pretrial inmates awaiting proceedings in Philadelphia. FDC Philadelphia, scheduled to cost $85 million, was built so the pretrial federal inmates could be housed in Philadelphia itself.

The federal government pursued building the prison at its selected site, with the legal processes for condemning structures on the site and acquiring the site beginning in March 1995 and with groundbreaking at a former parking lot on the tract in January 1997. Its formal opening was scheduled for June 1, 2000. Ultimately its construction cost was $68 million. 120 prisoners whose sentences were about to end served as a work cadre from April 1 until the prison's opening.

Mark Davis of The Philadelphia Inquirer wrote that the tunnel directly connecting the jail with the courthouse "appeared to appease nearly every critic" against the prison's construction, and that the prison did not visually appear like one.

Facility
Each  prison cell has slit windows, a bunk bed, a toilet, twin lockers, a writing table, a basin, and drains at the perimeters. The prison includes a caged recreation area with basketball and handball facility. The prison has facilities for reheating meals meant to be served to prisoners.

Notable incidents
On March 19, 2012, Richard Spisak, 35, pleaded guilty to engaging in a sexual act with a male prisoner over whom he had disciplinary authority while Spisak was a Senior Corrections Specialist at FDC Philadelphia in 2010. Spisak further admitted to threatening to set off his body alarm and falsely report that the inmate had attacked him if the inmate did not perform oral sex on him. The victim acquiesced after Spisak's threats. Two other inmates testified at Spisak's sentencing hearing that Spisak victimized them in a similar manner. Spisak was sentenced to 32 months in federal prison on June 28, 2012.

Notable Inmates (current and former)

See also

List of U.S. federal prisons
Federal Bureau of Prisons
Incarceration in the United States

References
Notes

External links

 FDC Philadelphia Official site
FDC Philadelphia Contact Information
FDC Philadelphia Visiting Regulations

Buildings and structures in Philadelphia
Prisons in Pennsylvania
Philadelphia
Market East, Philadelphia
2000 establishments in Pennsylvania